"Tommy Gun" is a song by the British punk rock band The Clash, released as the first single from their second album Give 'Em Enough Rope (1978).

Background 
Joe Strummer said that he got the idea for the song when he was thinking about terrorists, and how they probably enjoy reading about their killings as much as movie stars like seeing their films reviewed. While Topper Headon mimics the sound of gangster movie shootings with quick snare hits and the guitars are full of distortion and feedback, Strummer's sarcastic lyrics (I'm cutting out your picture from page one/I'm gonna get a jacket just like yours/And give my false support to your cause/Whatever you want, you're gonna get it!) condemn rather than condone violence: at the end of the song he sings, If death comes so cheap/Then the same goes for life!

In the liner notes of the Singles Box, Carl Barat (former frontman of Dirty Pretty Things and The Libertines), says that "Tommy Gun" was important for music at the time because it let people know what was going on in the world—it talked about real issues. He says,

Track listing
 7" vinyl
 "Tommy Gun" – 3:18
 "1-2 Crush On You" – 2:59

Personnel

"Tommy Gun"
 Joe Strummer – lead vocals, rhythm guitar
 Mick Jones – lead guitar, backing vocals
 Paul Simonon – bass guitar
 Topper Headon – drums

"1–2 Crush on You"
 Mick Jones – lead guitar, lead and backing vocals
 Joe Strummer – rhythm guitar, backing and lead (outro) vocals, piano
 Paul Simonon – bass guitar, backing vocals
 Topper Headon – drums
 Gary Barnacle – saxophone

Charts

Notes

References

1978 singles
The Clash songs
Songs written by Mick Jones (The Clash)
Songs written by Joe Strummer
Song recordings produced by Sandy Pearlman
1978 songs